Öxabäcks IF is a sports club in Öxabäck, Sweden, established in 1931. The women's soccer section was established in 1966 as one of the earliest organized women's soccer teams in Sweden and adopted the name "Öxabäck/Marks IF" in 1991 to show up more of its connections with Mark Municipality before adopting the previous name some years later.

The women's soccer team won the Swedish national championship in 1972 (unofficial), 1973, 1975, 1978, 1983, 1987 and 1988. and the Swedish Cup in 1985, 1986, 1987, 1988, 1989 and 1991. The club was relegated from Damallsvenskan during the 1998 season.

The floorball section merged with Örby IF and Berghems IF in 1999 to create Team Tygriket 99 – later IBK Tygriket 99.

References

External links
Official website 

1931 establishments in Sweden
Football clubs in Västra Götaland County
Sport in Västra Götaland County
Swedish floorball teams
Association football clubs established in 1931
Women's football clubs in Sweden